Mouna Raagam is an Indian Tamil language Musical drama series which premiered on 24 April 2017 which premiered on Star Vijay and digitally streams on Disney+ Hotstar. The show is produced by actress Chippy Renjith under Global Villagers. The series has two seasons. First season of the story stars with the seven-year-old Sakthi (Krithika Khelge) is born with a talent.

Its first season stars Krithika Khelge and Sherin Farhana with Rajeev Parameshwar, Chippy Renjith and Shamitha Shreekumar After 12-year leap, it continues as Mouna Raagam 2, stars Raveena Daha and Shilpa Nair with Rajeev Parameshwar, Chippy Renjith and Anusree Chembakassery additionally with Salmanul Faris and Rahul Ramachandran.

Synopsis
Kadhambari (Kaadhu maa), a rich, argumentative girl spoiler by her parents and was married to Karthik Krishna, a famous singer. They give birth to Shruthi. As the story goes, it was revealed that before the marriage of Karthik, he falls for Malliga, a village girl but unfortunately Karthik leaves the village  and under pressure from his  family, he marries kadhambari leaving Malliga pregnant and gives birth to Shakthi, who doesn't know the name of her father and likes singing. Kadhambari accidentally kills Mallika and escapes. When Shakthi's maternal aunt tries to sell her as she have the ability to sing well, she escapes from her. Disguised as a boy, she reaches Chennai and adopted by Karthik's brother Murali and his wife Nandhini. From the beginning, Kadhambari and her family hated Shakthi. Months passed and finally Murali and Nandhini learns about Shakthi's past and that she is Karthik's elder daughter. But they keep it a secret in fear of Kadhambari. Eventually, everyone in the family learn that Shakthi is Karthik's daughter. Kadhambari and her daughter Shruthi were infuriated. Meanwhile, Mallika is alive, taking treatment in a Ayurveda Hospital suffering from Memory Loss due to the accident. Later, Shakthi, Mallika and Karthik reunite and Mallika is bought Karthik's home. Mallika's pleasing words made Shruthi and Shakthi friends which made Kadhambari more angry. Later, she spoils Shruthi's mind and turns against Mallika and Shakthi. When Karthik introduces Mallika and Shakthi as his wife and daughter in an award show, Shruthi leaves home in anger. Kadhambari is affected mentally on Shruthi's disappearance. Shruthi is kidnapped by Guru, Raghav's brother. Raghav is Kadhambari's boyfriend during college days who tells that Shruthi is his daughter and not Karthik's due to their relationship and eventually blackmails her. In a spree, Kadhambari kills Raghav and later blackmailed by his brother Guru. Karthik, Mallika and Nandhini learns this truth but didn't ask anything to Kadhambari. Everyone in the family is searching for Shruthi. Meanwhile, Shakthi take care of Kadhambari as a mother. Guru's mother Raghavi decides to make Shruthi escape from Guru's captivity. Shruthi came back home. She blames Sakthi and Mallika for her disappearance while Mallika and Sakthi leave the house because of Shruthi.

Cast

Main
 Kritika Khelge as Shakti Krishna – A young music prodigy; Kartik and Mallika's daughter; Shruti's half-sister (2017-2020)
 Raveena Daha as older Sakthi (Sep.2020) (Cameo)
 Sherin Farhana as Shruthi Krishna – Kartik and Kaadhambari's daughter; Shakti's half-sister (2017-2020) 
 Rajeev Parameshwar as Karthik Krishna – Playback singer; Parvati's younger son; Murali's brother; Mallika and Kaadhambari's husband; Shakthi and Shruti's father. (2017-2020)
 Shamitha Shreekumar as Kaadhambari "Kaadhu Maa" Vishwanathan Krishna – Vishwanathan and Rukmani's elder daughter; Maya's sister; Karthik's second wife; Shruthi's mother. (2017-2020)
 Chippy Renjith as Malliga aka Karpagam – Natural singer; Pazhani's sister; Karthik's first wife; Shakthi's mother. (2017-2020)

Recurring
 Manoharan Krishnan as Murali Krishna – Parvati's elder son; Karthik's brother; Nandini's husband; Shakthi's former guardian (2017–2020)
 Tamil Selvi as Nandini Chokkalingam Krishna – Chokkalingam's daughter; Murali's wife.(2017–2020)
 A. Revathy as Parvathi Krishna – Murali's and Karthik's mother; Shakthi and Shruti's grandmother. (2017-2020)
 Supergood Kannan as Pazhaniswamy aka Pazhani – Mallika's brother; Swarna's husband; Nila's father; Shakthi's uncle. (2017–2020)
 Seema G. Nair as Swarna Pazhaniswamy – Pazhani's wife; Nila's mother; Shakthi's aunt.(2017–2020)
 Anjali Devi as Rukmani Vishwanathan – Vishwanathan's wife; Kadhambari and Maya's mother; Shruthi's grandmother.
 Anand Babu as Vishwanathan – Rukmani's husband; Kaadhambari and Maya's father; Shruthi's grandfather. (2017–2020)
 Sesu as Maya Vishwanathan – Vishwanathan and Rukmani's younger daughter; Kaadhambari's sister; Shruthi's aunt (2017-2019)
 Sindhu Manu Varma as Raghavi – Raghavan and Guru's mother (2019–2020)
 Nathan Shyam as, (2018-2020)
 Raghav - Raghavi's younger son; Guru's brother; Kaadhambari's obsessive ex-boyfriend
  Guru - Raghavi's elder son; Raghav's brother
 Janani Ashok Kumar as Ms. Mallika – Shruthi and Shakthi's governess (2017–2020)
 Raghavan as Guruji – An ayurvedic medical practitioner (2018–2020)
 Adhithiri Dinesh as Lavanya – Shakthi's best friend; Shruthi's enemy. (2017–2020)
 V. R. Thilagam as Chokkalingam – Nandini's father (2018)

Release and marketing
It was the second musical series in Tamil language series after Vinnaithaandi Varuvaayaa. It is a remake of Malayalam TV series Vanambadi.

Soundtrack

Soundtrack
The songs are penned by Shri. Harinarayanan. Most of the songs sung by Singer Varsha Renjith. The songs are as follows :

Sequel

In February 2021, Star Vijay announced the spiritual sequel of the series, titled Mouna Raagam 2, starring Raveena Daha, Rajeev Parameshwar, Chippy Renjith, Salmanul Faris, Rahul Ramachandran, Shilpa Nair and Divya Binu.

References

External links

Star Vijay original programming
Tamil-language musical television series
Tamil-language melodrama television series
2017 Tamil-language television series debuts
2020 Tamil-language television series endings
Tamil-language television shows
Tamil-language television series based on Bengali-languages television series